The Dr. Ivan Šreter Award is an annual Croatian linguistics award for the best Croatian language word coined.

The award is named after Dr. Ivan Šreter (1951–1991), a Croatian physician who was sentenced to jail time in Communist Yugoslavia in 1987 for choosing to use the distinct Croatian umirovljeni časnik to refer to his patient as a retired officer, rather than using penzionisani oficir. During the Croatian War of Independence he was taken captive by Serb troops and presumably killed, although his remains have not been found .

The contest and the award was initially designed by Stjepan Babić, and it has been organized by the literary magazine Jezik since 1993.

Winners
 1993 - László Bulcsú for suosnik, as a replacement for the term koaksijalni kabel (Eng: coaxial cable)
 1998 - straničnik as a replacement for bookmark
 2006 - Nada Arar-Premužić for uspornik, as a replacement for the term ležeći policajac (Eng: speed bump)
 2007 - Vilim Pantlik for naplatnica as a replacement for naplatna kućica (Eng: tollbooth)
 2009 - Drago Štambuk for proširnica, as a replacement for žilni potporanj (Eng: stent)
 2010 - Vinko Vukadin for ispraznica as a replacement for floskula (Eng: platitude)
 2011 - Šandor Dembitz for zatipak as a replacement for tipfeler (Eng: typo)
 2018 - Lidija Stević Brtan for zapozorje as a replacement for backstage
 2020 - Drago Štambuk and Karlo Kulaš for dišnik as a replacement for respirator

References

Croatian language
Croatian awards
1993 establishments in Croatia